is a Japanese tarento and former gravure idol.

Biography
Kawanaka was born in Tsuyama, Okayama Prefecture. She debuted as a member of Bachicco!, a local idol unit based on Okayama and Kagawa Prefectures. They later disbanded in 2003.

Kawanaka later debuted as a gravure idol in 2004 in her real and former stage name .

In April 2007, she renamed into  when she moved to an agency.

On 8 August 2010, Kawanaka married actor Yoshihiko Hakamada. Later in 23 August, it was announced that she was three months pregnant. On 18 February 2011, Kawanaka gave birth to a girl and became their first child.

While married, she left her affiliated office during her pregnancy.

In 2012, Kawanaka joins Space Craft Entertainment and returned as a "Mama Tarento".

Filmography

TV programmes

Internet

Works

DVD

Photo albums

References

External links
 – Official Blog 

Japanese gravure idols
People from Okayama Prefecture
1985 births
Living people